The Tattenham Corner line is a branch line in Southern England that runs between Purley in South London and Tattenham Corner in Surrey.

History

The line was opened in two parts. The first stage was built from Purley as far as Kingswood as the Chipstead Valley Railway. Local MP and Chairman of the South Eastern Railway at the time, Sir Cosmo Bonsor proposed the line in 1893. However, given the difficult terrain of the route which would have involved deep cuttings and tight bends, the idea was met by some opposition from his fellow directors. Despite this, construction eventually began in 1896 and on 2 November 1897 a single-track line to Kingswood (originally Kingswood and Burgh Heath) was complete.

In 1899 Sir Cosmo Bonsor formed a private syndicate to have the line extended from Kingswood to its current terminus at Tattenham Corner in order to catch the racegoing traffic. By Derby Day on 4 June 1901, the extension to Tattenham Corner was opened, during which time the line was also upgraded from single to double track.

The Chief Engineer to the Chipstead Valley Railway was Lt Col Arthur John Barry.

The line was third rail electrified by Southern Railway at 660 V DC in March 1928, and later upgraded to 750 V DC by British Rail post-war. The line is now part of the Thameslink, Southern and Great Northern franchise.

In May 2011 Smitham station was officially renamed , following a public vote on a new name for the station.

Route
The line diverges eastwards from the Brighton Main Line at Purley. It immediately splits from the Caterham Line and passes below the Brighton line. It then runs close to the Brighton line as far as Coulsdon Town, after which it turns westwards and follows the Chipstead Valley, eventually climbing to the high ground at Tattenham Corner.

The line is primarily a commuter route, but the station at Tattenham Corner was built to serve the Epsom Downs Racecourse, with large numbers of extra trains for The Derby on Derby day. There is also a railway terminus at Epsom Downs, about 2 km north of the racecourse, which was built by the London, Brighton and South Coast Railway and opened on 22 May 1865.

Oyster and contactless payment cards are valid for travel on the entire length of the route. The line from Purley to Tattenham Corner is located entirely within Travelcard Zone 6.

Services
Passenger services on the line are operated by Southern.

There is an all day Monday-Saturday service to London Bridge, calling at all stations to East Croydon, then fast to London Bridge. These trains combine/divide at Purley, the other section being for the Caterham Line. At peak times, there are additional services to Victoria. On Sundays, these trains additionally call at all stations via Sydenham.

Services from Tattenham Corner are provided by 4 or 5-car Class 377 EMUs. 

The London and South East Route Utilisation Strategy released in July 2011 laid out a provisional timetable for the Thameslink Programme. Services 'assumed to operate through the Thameslink core in 2018' featured an eight-car Tattenham Corner to Welwyn Garden City service. This did not materialise.

In December 2013 the old sidings at Tattenham Corner were reinstated to support overnight storage of some of the new trains ordered since 2011, as part of the train-lengthening process.

References

Further reading

 
 
 

Transport in the London Borough of Croydon
Rail transport in Surrey
Railway lines in London
Railway lines opened in 1897
Railway lines in South East England
Standard gauge railways in England